Cody Jordan "ThankGod4Cody" Fayne is an American producer, songwriter, and musician, most known for his production work on SZA's acclaimed albums Ctrl and SOS, as well as his 2019 debut album Cody of Nazareth.

Personal life 
After a period of study at Middle Tennessee State University, Fayne moved first to Atlanta and then Los Angeles to enter the music industry at the behest of friend and Top Dawg Entertainment producer Tyran "Scum" Donaldson, hoping to work with fellow Tennessean Isaiah Rashad who Fayne knew through mutual friends. He worked at The Home Depot in the meantime to make ends meet, descending into a brief period of depression when his efforts to produce or write on various iterations of Rashad's future album The Sun's Tirade proved unfruitful. Fayne continued to refine his productions, encountering Rashad's TDE labelmate Solana "SZA" Rowe at an impromptu LA studio meeting. Rowe overheard Fayne’s production from an adjacent room and immediately knew she wanted the track for herself, which evolved into her 2014 single "Sobriety". She subsequently asked Fayne to attend her 2016 writing camp held at producer Carter Lang's Michigan lake house, where he crafted notable Ctrl records "2 AM", "Love Galore" (with Lang), and "Broken Clocks".

Discography
Studio projects
 Cody Of Nazareth (2019)

Production and songwriting credits

Credits are courtesy of Discogs, Tidal, Apple Music, and AllMusic.

Guest appearances

Awards and nominations

References 

Year of birth missing (living people)
Living people
Music production
African-American songwriters
African-American record producers
American hip hop record producers